The AMD LiveBox is an announced mini-desktop computer that was revealed at Computex 2012. It features a 1 GHz AMD C-60 processor, 1 GB of RAM, a Samsung 64 GB SSD, and Radeon 6200 graphics. With respect to connectivity, it will come with two USB 2.0 ports, a Gigabit Ethernet, HDMI, SD card slot, SIM slot (with support for quad band 3G) and Bluetooth 4.0. There will be no need for any external power brick to power this device as it has its own built in power adapter.  There is no WI-FI connectivity in the currently announced model and it is unknown whether there will be a version with such capabilities. It is comparable in size, usability and design as the Intel NUC. There has been no price or release date on the system, and no further details released on the topic. It is uncommon to see such a product being produced by AMD since the company hasn't played much of a role in the mini desktop scene.
Since it is using an x86 based chip, it is capable of running Windows 7 which is also the operating system that it will come preinstalled with. It will also be able to support users wanting to upgrade to Windows 8 without any problems.

Practical uses
The AMD LiveBox, with its small form factor, is being pushed towards basic users and the company also hopes it will grow adoption within school computer labs. It also has the  capabilities of being an HTPC (Home theater PC) with its small form factor, HDMI out and the ability to run Windows OS as well as any other x86 based OS. With its small form factor and ease the ability to easily set it up, it will also work very well for developers as a machine to develop and test on.

Reception
Many people are happy and excited for the device to be released, however consumers are worried about the price that it will be released for. Users believe that having Windows coming preinstalled on the device will unnecessarily raise the price of the product. Since the device is a great device to be used as an HTPC many consumers want a version without Windows preinstalled so the price will be lower and they can install Ubuntu or XBMC on it to use as a home media device.

References

External links
ChipLoco
Engadget

Computers
AMD products